Rumeshteh Mowmenabad (also Romanized as Rūmeshteh Mow'menābād; also known as Mow'menābād) is a village in Firuzabad Rural District, Firuzabad District, Selseleh County, Lorestan Province, Iran. At the 2006 census, its population was 174, in 30 families.

References 

Towns and villages in Selseleh County